Jerry Katherman (April 7, 1896 – February 1, 1972) was an American football and basketball player and coach. 

Katherman was a 1921 graduate of Ohio Northern University. He served as the head men's basketball coach Capital University in Columbus, Ohio from 1923 to 1929.

References

1896 births
1972 deaths
Capital Comets football coaches
Capital Comets men's basketball coaches
Ohio Northern Polar Bears football players
High school football coaches in Ohio